The football (soccer) Campeonato Brasileiro Série B 1971, the second level of Brazilian National League, was played from September 12 to December 22, 1971. The competition had 23 clubs. The tournament consisted in a fusion of the already existing Torneio Centro-Sul and the Copa Norte-Nordeste, with the champions of each tournament facing off in the finals.

Villa Nova beat Remo on the finals, and was declared 1971 Brazilian Série B champions. The relegation and promotion system hadn't been implemented yet, so no clubs were promoted.

Stages of the competition

First phase
Group A

Group B

Group C

Group D

Group E

Second phase
Group 1

Group 2

Group 3

Group 4

Semifinals

Finals

Sources
 http://www.rsssfbrasil.com/tablesae/br1971l2.htm

References

Campeonato Brasileiro Série B seasons
B